Umed Khabibulloyev (born 12 November 1978) is a Tajikistani footballer who plays as a defender most recently for FC Istiklol and the Tajikistan national football team.

Career statistics

International

Statistics accurate as of match played 6 September 2011

Honors
Varzob Dushanbe
 Tajik League (3): 1998, 1999, 2000
 Tajik Cup (2): 1998, 1999
Khujand
 Tajik Cup (2): 2008
Istiklol
 Tajik League (2): 2010, 2011
 Tajik Cup (1): 2010

References

External links

1978 births
Living people
Tajikistani footballers
Tajikistan international footballers
Association football defenders